The 149th Aviation Regiment is an aviation regiment of the U.S. Army.

Structure

 1st Battalion (Attack)
 2nd Battalion (General Support)
 Headquarters and Headquarters Company 
 Detachment 1 (AR ARNG)
 Company A (AR ARNG)
 Company B (CH-47)
 Detachment 1 (OK ARNG)
 Company C (TX ARNG)
 Company D
 Detachment 1 (AR ARNG)
 Company E
 Detachment 1 (AR ARNG)
 Company F (TX ARNG)
 Company G (UH-60) (NM ARNG)

References

149